Cold Skin is a 2017 French-Spanish science fiction-horror film directed by Xavier Gens and based on the 2002 novel of the same name by Albert Sánchez Piñol. The film was released on 20 October 2017 in Spain. Samuel Goldwyn Films released the film in the United States.

Plot

In 1914, a young Englishman travels to a remote island in the South Atlantic to work for one year as a weather observer. When he and the captain of the ship search for the previous weather observer, they realize he is missing, and the only other inhabitant of the island is the caretaker of the crudely fortified lighthouse, Gruner, who greets them both coldly. Gruner says the previous weather observer cannot return with the ship as he has died from typhus, possibly swimming in the sea, and there is no body. The captain suggests the newcomer leave with him but he refuses.

The unnamed man explores the island, seeing strange rock circles on the beach. When he returns to the cabin he finds the diary of the previous meteorologist which talks of strange creatures from the sea attacking; soon after reading this he is beset at night by the creatures. He hides in the cellar and jabs one of the creatures, which looks through the floorboards, causing them to flee. The next day he calls to Gruner to let him into the lighthouse, but to no avail. In the cabin he discovers a rifle among the baggage, and, determined to make a stand, he reinforces the cabin. At night the creatures come and he shoots at them. Eventually, he has to resort to starting a fire as there are too many to take on. This causes them to flee but ruins the cabin.

The next day he observes Gruner leaving the lighthouse, and follows him down to the rocks where he discovers a female sea creature. Gruner prevents him from shooting her and shows that she is 'tame'. Gruner gives the man the name "Friend" and  he explains that like a dog she will not leave her master no matter how cruel he is. She licks Friend's wounded hand and it heals.

Friend offers to share ammunition and other supplies with Gruner if he can stay in the lighthouse, which Gruner accepts. He wonders if the creatures keep coming for the lighthouse because they want to reclaim the female sea creature. More creatures attack that night, but Friend faints and Gruner becomes angry at his uselessness and tells him to do menial activities such as fetch water instead. The next night Gruner locks Friend outside on the balcony with his gun, leaving him to see if he can fend for himself against the creatures. In the morning Gruner discovers him covered in creature blood but alive.

The two men settle into a routine; the creatures attack several nights and they are forced to constantly keep watch. Friend discovers Gruner has been having sex with the female creature. Friend grows to like the creature, and names her Aneris, while Gruner physically and sexually abuses her. Friend recalls why he came to the island: to find peace in nothingness.

One night, the duo come perilously close to being killed when they are overrun by creatures. Locking themselves inside the lighthouse light-room, Gruner is badly bitten on the foot as he flees upstairs. At dawn the creatures leave for the sea. Aneris tends Gruner's wounded foot. When Friend tries to signal a passing ship for rescue, Gruner prevents him from doing so, while Aneris tries to protect him, enraging Gruner.

Friend takes to walking along the beach collecting whale bones and carving them. He shows one shaped like a boat to Aneris and she leads him to an abandoned boat on the beach. He tells Gruner about it but Gruner says the boat is too small for an escape from the island, and that he knew it was there, remaining from when a Portuguese man had used it to escape a shipwreck, but had been killed by the creatures. He says the ship's cargo contained dynamite but the only dynamite the Portuguese man had brought with him had been water-logged.

Friend shows interest in exploring the shipwreck, while Gruner does not. However, after seeing Friend swimming in a pool with Aneris, Gruner changes his mind due to jealousy, secretly hoping that Friend might die in the attempt. They use the boat to row out to the wreck and Friend dons an old diving suit to go down and search for the dynamite. While recovering some, he sees child-like versions of the creatures playing. Once they return, they discover that the recovered dynamite is dry enough to use.

Friend and Gruner form a plan to lure as many sea creatures to the lighthouse before setting off dynamite, believing that the show of force will drive them off. Aneris is forced onto the balcony and made to 'sing' to attract them. The creatures attack, but Gruner fails to set off the explosives, forcing Friend to run to the top of the lighthouse to reconnect the detonator. The resulting blast kills many of the creatures. Gruner sets off a secondary set of explosives closer to the lighthouse, knocking both Friend and himself unconscious.

In the morning, Gruner finishes off the wounded and dying creatures that are lying on the beach with a harpoon. Friend believes the creatures are more civilized than Gruner makes them out to be after seeing one of the dead creatures wearing a necklace. Gruner, enraged, hurls it into the sea. He explains that he found Aneris sea creature years ago as a baby trapped in a net and rescued her, believing that she owes him her life. The following night the creatures do not attack, and a great wailing sound comes from the sea which Friend takes to be mourning. Aneris disappears. While Gruner sleeps, Friend discovers a photo of Gruner as a young man with a wife.

Friend resumes walking along the beach and leaves a carved present for the creatures. He discovers a child creature investigating his present, and Aneris returns, appearing more confident and bold. They are interrupted by Gruner firing a gun. Friend tries to tell him that the creatures – more of whom have appeared behind Aneris – want a truce. Gruner commands Aneris to return to him but she refuses, causing him to scream that 'no-one leaves Gruner'. He runs back to the lighthouse and shoots a flare at the child, striking him in the chest and killing him. Friend runs after Gruner as he continues to fire flares, and after a struggle throws him to the ground and stabs his leg. Gruner gains the upper hand and attempts to kill Friend with an axe, but Friend reveals that Gruner is the previous meteorologist and urges Gruner to stop, telling him that he is not a murderer. Gruner drops the axe and staggers outside to be killed by the sea creatures.

Sometime later, the next ship arrives to replace Friend. The captain mistakes him for the lighthouse-keeper Gruner and Friend does not correct him. He maintains the role, contemplating that this is the peace he originally sought.

Cast
 Ray Stevenson as Gruner
 David Oakes as Friend
 Aura Garrido as Aneris
 John Benfield as Captain Axel
  as Weather Official
 Winslow Iwaki as Senegalese sailor
 Ben Temple as Ship Official
 William Frater as Fishman

Reception

Cold Skin has grossed a worldwide total of $737,478. On review aggregator Rotten Tomatoes, the film holds an approval rating of 48% based on 27 reviews, and an average rating of 6.10/10. The website's critical consensus reads, "Cold Skin exerts a strong visual pull, even if all that icy atmosphere isn't a truly satisfying substitute for a story that dares to go somewhere different." American metal band Cactus Cathedral wrote their song "For A Fool" from their first album The Forgotten Frontier about the film.

See also 
 List of Spanish films of 2017

References

External links
 
 
 La piel fría (Cold Skin) at Box Office Mojo

Works set in lighthouses
2017 films
2017 horror films
Films based on Spanish novels
French science fiction horror films
Spanish science fiction horror films
Science fiction adventure films
2010s monster movies
English-language French films
English-language Spanish films
Films directed by Xavier Gens
2010s English-language films
Films set in Antarctica
2010s French films
2010s Spanish films